Stenoma sinuata is a moth in the family Depressariidae. It was described by Johan Christian Fabricius in 1798. It is found on the West Indies.

References

Moths described in 1798
Stenoma